The JSC ELEMASH Machine-Building Plant is a company based in Elektrostal, Russia. It is part of TVEL (Rosatom group).

Before and during World War II, the Elektrostal plant produced bombs and other munitions. After the war, it produced pure uranium for use in nuclear weapons and it also produced fuel elements for nuclear power plants.

See also
UEC-Perm Engines

References

External links
 

1917 establishments in Russia
Companies based in Moscow Oblast
Energy companies established in 1917
Manufacturing companies of Russia
Ministry of Medium Machine Building
Recipients of the Order of Lenin
Rosatom
Defence companies of the Soviet Union
Nuclear technology in the Soviet Union